Xiaolin Chronicles is an animated/CG television series presented as a continuation of Xiaolin Showdown. The series premiered on August 26, 2013, with three back-to-back episodes serving as a preview. The full series premiered on September 14, 2013. It was produced by ActionFliks Media Corporation in collaboration with the French studio Genao Productions. It is the only Xiaolin Showdown product without the involvement of Warner Bros. Animation.

The show aired for twenty episodes from August 26, 2013 to March 6, 2014 on Disney XD, leaving the last six episodes unaired in the United States until July 1, 2015, when Chronicles was made available to watch on Netflix.

In a newsletter published on July 25, 2015, creator Christy Hui announced that Chronicles would not continue with a second season and is a standalone series. However, she stated that there would be a new Xiaolin project that will continue in a format to that of Showdown.

Production
Produced in France and the United States with Christy Hui returning as executive producer, the show is animated in 2D animation while CGI was used for all of the Xiaolin Showdown scenes. The show features new character designs and a slightly altered logo for the show. With the exception of Tara Strong (Omi, Ping Pong) and Jennifer Hale (Kimiko in Chronicles only, Katnappe, Willow), the original's voice cast was replaced due to budget and timing issues. All Shen Gong Wu from the original series had to be renamed, although Warner Bros. Animation was not involved with the series before ended the partnership with the series after ended in 2006, the titles and rights to the names was originally produced by Warner Bros. before being moved to ActionFliks Media Corporation during production for unknown reasons. Sunwoo Entertainment contributed some of the animation for this series.

Plot
Omi, Kimiko, and Clay have recently risen to the rank of Shoku Warrior except for Raimundo (who attained the rank previously), where they must continue to uphold their duty of finding and collecting all of the mystical Shen Gong Wu artifacts before the evil Heylin forces do. They are joined by a recruit from Europe named Ping Pong, who competes with a mysterious girl named Willow for the position of Xiaolin Apprentice. Through the events of the show's pilot, the monks learn that Willow is evil, and is the apprentice to the formidable Heylin warrior Chase Young. She and Chase destroy the temple and take all the Shen Gong Wu. With their temple destroyed, the monks must search for a new temple, while still trying to collect all the Shen Gong Wu and protecting the world from the likes of Chase Young and the villainous Jack Spicer.

Characters
 Omi (voiced by Tara Strong) – The Xiaolin Dragon of Water, his elemental Shen Gong Wu is the Orb of Torpedo. His main attack, "Shoku Neptune Water", allows him to control and manipulate water. He is the most skilled of the Xiaolin monks. He has a very big ego and tends to think himself better than everyone else. This sometimes makes him brag and put others down, and when someone does something better than him, he usually becomes jealous and tries to outdo that person. Due to his sheltered upbringing, he is somewhat sexist, and he has a penchant for misinterpreting modern slang and idioms.
 Raimundo Pedrosa (voiced by Eric Bauza) – The Xiaolin Dragon of Wind hailing from Rio de Janeiro, Brazil, his elemental Shen Gong Wu is the Sword Of Lucida. His main attack, "Shoku Astro Wind", allows him to fly and to literally blow his enemies away. Raimundo is lazy, impulsive, and prone to making rash decisions; however, he is an excellent strategist and cares deeply for those he considers friends.
 Kimiko Tohomiko (voiced by Jennifer Hale) – The Xiaolin Dragon of Fire from Tokyo, Japan, her elemental Shen Gong Wu is the Hanabi Star. Her main attack, "Shoku Mars Fire", allows her to conjure up great blazing fireballs. Known to be short-tempered & stubborn, Kimiko hates being made to feel incompetent or insignificant. Despite this, she is quite compassionate and affectionate toward her friends. Kimiko's interests include technology and fashion.
 Clay Bailey (voiced by David Kaye) – The Xiaolin Dragon of Earth from Texas in the United States, his elemental Shen Gong Wu is the Fist of the Iron Bear. His main attack, "Shoku Jupiter Earth", allows him to create fissures or shatter boulders. He is shown to be gentle despite his big size and can often come up with simple solutions to complicated problems.
 Ping Pong (voiced by Tara Strong) – The 5th monk chosen at the Xiaolin Temple as Xiaolin Dragon of the Wood, Ping Pong is the first new character introduced in this series. Ping Pong resembles Omi, but younger & wearing big green glasses. His birth name is "Boris Antonio Rolf Jean-Pierre Gaulle LeGrand IV". Due to his long name, Omi decides to call him "Ping Pong". As his protégé, Omi refers to Ping Pong as his "little gecko". In his backstory, Ping Pong grew up in Europe as a speedy errand boy delivering messages to monasteries throughout Europe. He was soon inspired by hearing legends of the Xiaolin monks and decides to join them on their adventures. His main abilities are his running speed and fast moves.
 Dojo Kanojo Cho (voiced by Michael Donovan) – A size-shifting Chinese dragon, Dojo serves as the Xiaolin Warriors' main mode of transportation and wisecracking advisor. He often shows affection for Master Fung.
 Master Fung (voiced by Michael Donovan) – A wise old master, trainer, and guide to the Xiaolin Warriors, he provides the Xiaolin Warriors advice that can help them solve their problems.
 Chase Young (voiced by David Kaye) – The main antagonist, Chase is an immortal evil warrior who renews his desire to destroy the Xiaolin Monks and plots to create a Heylin Empire. He created Shadow and shares a connection with her.
 Shadow (voiced by Jennifer Hale) – Shadow, the second new character introduced in XC, is a dark spy who works for Chase Young and often thinks Jack and Chase are too incompetent to be evil. She can hide in the shadows and communicate telepathically with Chase Young. When the Xiaolin monks first met her, she was revealed as a normal girl named Willow. She and Ping Pong competed for the Xiaolin Apprentice top spot, as well as for Omi's attention. Kimiko began to grow more suspicious of her and eventually discovered her secret identity as Shadow.
 Wuya (voiced by Cree Summer) – The once most powerful and evil Heylin Witch, she was defeated by Grand Master Dashi in the first Xiaolin Showdown and imprisoned in a spring contained within a puzzle box. Released 1,500 years later by Jack Spicer, Wuya needs him to collect Dashi's Shen Gong Wu to rule the world once again and plunge the world into 10,000 years of darkness. She frequently berates and mocks Jack. She returns to her human self thanks to Shadow.
 Jack Spicer (voiced by Eric Bauza) – Self-proclaiming as an "Evil Boy Genius" and aspiring to rule the world, Jack is largely incompetent and a bit of a bumbler, though he is persistent and never loses sight of his goals. He often refers to himself as an "evil entrepreneur." Sometimes allies himself with the Xiaolin Monks, but tries hard to impress Chase Young.
 Katnappe (voiced by Jennifer Hale) – A cat-themed criminal and one of Jack Spicer's allies.
 Tubbimura (voiced by Eric Bauza) – An overweight but agile ninja and one of Jack Spicer's allies.
 Cyclops – A one-eyed giant and one of Jack Spicer's allies.
 Tiny Sim/Weaselnator (voice by Tara Strong) – A young aspiring villain who idolized Jack, seeking to apprentice under the evil genius. However, once he acquired the Rooster Booster Shen Gong Wu, he betrayed Jack and dissolved their partnership. Before meeting Jack, Tiny Sim was the president and webmaster for the Online Jack Fanclub.
 Pandabubba (voiced by Eric Bauza) – A panda-themed crime lord.
 Salvador Cumo (voiced by David Kaye) – A charming but conniving criminal that can transform into a Komodo dragon and regenerate lost limbs. He was once allies with Wuya and seems to have some sort of mysterious connection to Chase Young.
 Warden (voiced by Eric Bauza) – A demented Game Show Host summoned by Chase Young to keep the Xiaolin Monks from obtaining The Mask of The Green Monkey.

Episodes

Principal voice actors
 Eric Bauza - Raimundo Pedrosa, Jack Spicer, Tubbimura, PandaBubba, Grand Master Dashi, Warden
 Michael Donovan - Dojo Kanojo Cho, Master Fung
 Jennifer Hale - Kimiko Tomohiko, Ashley (Katnappe), Shadow, Willow, Princess Kaila, Miseryland Cheerleaders
 David Kaye - Clay Bailey, Chase Young, Salvadore Cumo, Rocco
 Tara Strong - Omi, Ping Pong, Muffin Face, Tiny Sim
 Cree Summer - Wuya, Tigress (Tomoko)

Crew
 Collette Sunderman - Casting Director and Voice Director

International Broadcast
The series premiered on Cartoon Network in the United Kingdom on March 4, 2014. Cartoon Network Southeast Asia followed on December 15, 2014. In Australia, Xiaolin Chronicles debuted on Eleven on June 7, 2015, with a second run on Cartoon Network beginning July 17, 2015. The series debuted with the launch of Family Chrgd on October 9, 2015 in Canada.

Notes

References

External links
 

Xiaolin Showdown
2010s American animated television series
2010s French animated television series
2013 American television series debuts
2013 French television series debuts
2015 American television series endings
2015 French television series endings
American children's animated action television series
American children's animated adventure television series
American children's animated science fantasy television series
French children's animated action television series
French children's animated adventure television series
French children's animated science fantasy television series
American computer-animated television series
French computer-animated television series
Anime-influenced Western animated television series
English-language television shows
French-language television shows
Disney XD original programming
American sequel television series
Treasure hunt television series
Martial arts television series
Japan in non-Japanese culture